Jens Schreiber (born 26 August 1982) is a German freestyle swimmer who won four medals at European Short Course Swimming Championships in 2003, 2004 and 2006; in 2006, his 4×50 m medley relay team won gold medals, setting a new world record. He also competed in four freestyle events at the Summer Olympics of 2004 and 2008; his best achievement was sixth place in the 4 × 200 m freestyle relay in 2004.

References

External links
 
 2008.nbcolympics profile

1982 births
Living people
Olympic swimmers of Germany
Swimmers at the 2004 Summer Olympics
Swimmers at the 2008 Summer Olympics
German male freestyle swimmers
Sportspeople from Oldenburg